Ashurst Australia is the Australian branch of Ashurst LLP, an international commercial law firm. The Australian headquarters of Ashurst are in Sydney.

Prior to its acquisition by Ashurst, the Australian firm was named Blake Dawson, one of the Big Six leading Australian law firms.

History

Australian predecessor 
Blake Dawson was founded in 1841. Its founder, James Hunter Ross, emigrated from Scotland to set up practice in Melbourne on the corner of Bourke and William Streets. In 1865 its founder died, and the firm was renamed to Blake & Riggall in 1874. In 1881 a firm later to be known as Waldron & Dawson was founded on Pitt Street in Sydney.

These two firms were prominent in the legal systems of Australia's colonies. Their client bases included large corporations, banks, mining companies, and pastoral companies.

The firms were merged in 1988, alongside two other firms; Collison Hunt & Richardson (Perth) and McCubbery Train Love and Thomas (Port Moresby). This merger brought together lawyers from all of the major commercial centres in Australia as well as important centres in the Asia and Pacific regions. Three further Asian offices were established, in Jakarta in 1988, Shanghai in 1995 and Singapore in 2009.

In 2007 the firm was rebranded to Blake Dawson.

Acquisition 
In September 2011, it was announced that the firm would combine its Asian business with that of British law firm Ashurst and be re-branded as Ashurst across all offices on 1 March 2012, followed by a full financial merger of the two firms on 1 November 2013. The table below summarises the merger of the two firms.

References

External links 
Ashurst website

Law firms of Australia
Law firms established in 1841
1841 establishments in Australia